Valentin Alexandru Cojocaru (born 1 October 1995) is a Romanian professional footballer who plays as a goalkeeper for Belgian First Division A club OH Leuven.

Club career

Steaua București
In 2011, he was selected for a trial at Liverpool, but he returned to Steaua because the clubs couldn't agree on a transfer sum. 
He made his first appearance for Steaua București on 7 May 2013 against Gloria Bistrița, a game won with the score of 1–0. He is the son of former football referee Ispas Cojocaru.

On 1 September 2016, Crotone announced the signing of Cojocaru on loan with a buy-out option.

On 26 January 2017, Cojocaru joined Italian club Frosinone on loan.

Apollon Limassol
On 7 September 2017, Apollon Limassol announced the signing of Cojocaru. On 22 January 2018, Apollon Limassol mutually agreed to end player's contract.

Viitorul Constanța
On 24 January 2018, Cojocaru joined Liga I side Viitorul Constanța.

On 24 January 2020, Cojocaru joined Liga I side Voluntari on loan until the end of the season with a buy-out option.

Dnipro-1
On 5 July 2021, he joined Dnipro-1.

Feyenoord loan
In March 2022 he moved on loan to Feyenoord.

International career
In November 2016 Valentin Cojocaru received his first call-up to the senior Romania squad for matches against Poland and Russia.

Career statistics

Club

Honours
Steaua București
Liga I: 2012–13, 2014–15
Cupa României: 2014–15
Supercupa României: 2013
Cupa Ligii: 2014–15, 2015–16

Viitorul Constanța
Cupa României: 2018–19
Supercupa României: 2019

Feyenoord
 UEFA Europa Conference League runner-up: 2021–22

References

External links

1995 births
Living people
Romanian people of Moldovan descent
Footballers from Bucharest
Romanian footballers
Association football goalkeepers
Romania under-21 international footballers
Liga I players
Liga II players
Serie A players
Serie B players
Cypriot First Division players
Ukrainian Premier League players
Belgian Pro League players
FC Steaua II București players
FC Steaua București players
F.C. Crotone players
Frosinone Calcio players
Apollon Limassol FC players
FC Viitorul Constanța players
FC Voluntari players
SC Dnipro-1 players
Feyenoord players
Oud-Heverlee Leuven players
Romanian expatriate footballers
Romanian expatriate sportspeople in Italy
Expatriate footballers in Italy
Romanian expatriate sportspeople in Cyprus
Expatriate footballers in Cyprus
Romanian expatriate sportspeople in Ukraine
Expatriate footballers in Ukraine
Romanian expatriate sportspeople in the Netherlands
Expatriate footballers in the Netherlands
Romanian expatriate sportspeople in Belgium
Expatriate footballers in Belgium